At about 12:30 am on 21 June 2020, two young men were shot dead at a street party in Moss Side, an inner-city area of Manchester in North West England.

Background
The shooting took place at an afterparty, illegal under COVID-19 lockdown rules. In other illegal raves in Greater Manchester shortly before the incident, a man had died of a suspected overdose and a woman was raped. The police say there are many considerations when it comes to shutting down or letting raves continue. The after party was an unplanned event that followed a Black Lives Matter barbecue that had been earlier held nearby, but was unconnected to this prior event, which peacefully finished at 20:00.

Incident
During a night time street party in a car park in Moss Side at the junction of Caythorpe Street, Broadfield Road, and Bowes Street a man opened fire on those attending at about 00:30 BST, causing them to run screaming from the area. Gunshot was reported at a location on Caythorpe Street, with armed police responding to the scene at 01:00. They discovered a party attended by hundreds of people, in violation of COVID-19 lockdown guidelines in the country at the time. The police report that a "community event" had taken place in the area earlier in the day, and the party had been an unplanned after party but still had a DJ. A local resident said the party had begun at around 22:00 the night before, and that Moss Side was a peaceful neighbourhood with infrequent spikes of violent activity.

Casualties
The two fatally wounded men self-presented at an Accident and Emergency department, either shortly before 01:00 (according to the police) or at about 01:30 (according to the Manchester Evening News), dying later. Initially one death, of a man aged 36, was reported before the other man, aged 21, also died.

Investigation
A murder investigation was opened the same day. On 26 June 2020, a 32-year-old Birmingham woman was arrested on suspicion of the murder of the two men. By September she had been released on bail, while a 25-year-old man had been arrested. A month later the police indicated they were looking for another suspect.

References

2020 crimes in the United Kingdom
2020 in England
2020s in Manchester
Attacks in the United Kingdom in 2020
June 2020 events in the United Kingdom
Unsolved crimes in England
Violence in Manchester
2020s crimes in Manchester